The Battle of Sobota was a battle that took place near Sobota, Poland, on 23 August 1655, between the armies of the Polish–Lithuanian Commonwealth on the one hand and of Sweden on the other.

After Charles X Gustav's entry into Poland, he made camp at Koło. Here the Swedish king received representatives from John II Casimir of Poland in an attempt to sue for peace. The Polish attempts were in vain and the Swedish king marched towards Warsaw. John II Casimir put up a small army in order to hinder the Swedish advance while seeking assistance from other rulers. The forces clashed on 23 August, resulting in a Swedish victory as the Polish forces were routed after rapid, but intense fighting.

After the battle, Charles X Gustav left the majority of his army under the command of field marshal Arvid Wirtenberg von Debern while he himself continued his march towards Warsaw with about 2000 cavalry and 1200 infantry. Warsaw fell with no resistance on 29 August.

References

Sources
  Svenskt Militärhistoriskt Bibliotek 
  Leszek Podhorodecki, Rapier i koncerz, Warsaw 1985, pp. 247–248

Sobota
1655 in Europe
Sobota
Sobota
History of Łódź Voivodeship
1655 in the Polish–Lithuanian Commonwealth